Professor Ojo is a DC Comics supervillain. His main enemies are Green Arrow, Green Lantern and Richard Dragon. Ojo is the Spanish word for "eye".

Publication history
Professor Ojo first appeared in Richard Dragon, Kung Fu Fighter #16 (August 1977) and was created by Ric Estrada and Denny O'Neil.

Fictional character biography
The son of an assistant in an early atomic energy facility, whose poor safety standards exposed workers to massive doses of hard radiation, Ojo was born without eyes. Brilliant but blind, Ojo eventually created a device allowing him to see, and eventually became associated with the League of Assassins, a part of the criminal empire of Ra's al Ghul. Loathing atomic energy, Ojo stole an experimental atomic submarine, bringing him into conflict with G.O.O.D. agents Richard Dragon and Benjamin Turner. Although the two martial artists helped recover the stolen submarine, Turner stayed behind while Dragon tried to return the submarine - one of Ojo's operatives had murdered the woman Turner loved, and he would not leave without confronting him. However, Ojo captured and brainwashed Turner, turning him into the assassin known as the Bronze Tiger. Ojo would sell Turner's services for some time, first to an underground fighting tournament, then to Barney Ling (the treacherous head of G.O.O.D.), and finally to Sensei of the League of Assassins.

Meanwhile, Professor Ojo placed a strange hovering eye over Star City, the home of Green Arrow. Assuming the eye was a threat, Arrow and his Green Lantern friend Hal Jordan attempted to disarm it, but to no effect. Later, Green Arrow, along with a different Green Lantern, Guy Gardner, destroyed the eye.<ref>Green Lantern Vol. 2 #116</ref>

That was only one of Professor Ojo's spy eyes and another one would attack Hal Jordan and Green Arrow in Gotham City's Arkham Asylum, where the eye managed to free Alexander Tuttle, the Crumbler. The two villains attempted to destroy the atomic power plant built by the Crumbler's father. Professor Ojo planned to thus show the world the devastating effect of radiation. Even though Ojo upgraded the Crumbler's power, both villains were defeated by Green Lantern and Green Arrow.

In other media
Professor Ojo appears in the Young Justice'' episode "Infiltrator", voiced by Nolan North. He is a member of the League of Shadows and uses his technological knowledge to use nanobots known as the FOG to raid and destroy buildings like S.T.A.R. Labs and WayneTech. Before he could attack WayneTech, he was attacked and defeated by Superboy. In "Terrors", Professor Ojo was seen as an inmate at Belle Reve. Two times he realized that Tommy Terror was actually Superboy in disguise, but both times was unsuccessfully able to tell the other inmates.

References

Comics characters introduced in 1977
DC Comics scientists
DC Comics supervillains
Fictional blind characters
Characters created by Dennis O'Neil
Fictional Spanish people